The Curtiss-Wright AT-9 Jeep was a twin-engined advanced trainer aircraft used by the United States during World War II to bridge the gap between single-engined trainers and twin-engined combat aircraft. The AT-9 had a low-wing cantilever monoplane configuration, retractable landing gear and was powered by two Lycoming R-680-9 radial engines.

Development
Curtiss-Wright anticipated the requirement for this type of "high-performance" aircraft and designed the Curtiss-Wright CW-25, a twin-engined trainer, which possessed the takeoff and landing characteristics of a light bomber. Using the same basic design as the larger Cessna AT-17 Bobcat, the new CW-25 was designed to simulate the demands of multi-engined operations. The design featured a small layout, grouping two Lycoming R-680-9 radial engines forward and using a retractable tailwheel landing gear to achieve the performance necessary to meet the requirements of an advanced trainer. The single CW-25 prototype acquired for evaluation had a welded steel-tube fuselage structure with the wings, fuselage and tail unit fabric-covered.

Operational history

The first prototype Model 25 flew in 1941 and the production version entered service as the AT-9 in 1942. Named the "Fledgling" by Curtiss-Wright, it commonly became known as the "Jeep" in the United States Army Air Forces (USAAF). The prototype CW-25 had a fabric-covered steel tube fuselage and fabric-covered wings and tail units, but production AT-9s were of stressed metal skin construction.

The AT-9 was purposely designed to be less stable and proved to be difficult to fly or land, which made it particularly suitable for teaching new pilots to cope with the demanding flight characteristics of a new generation of high-performance, multi-engined aircraft such as the Martin B-26 Marauder and Lockheed P-38 Lightning.

A total of 491 AT-9s were built before production ended and a new production run of 300 of the generally similar AT-9A commenced.

Because of its difficult flying characteristics the AT-9 was not offered for sale to civilians after the war, although many non-flying examples were given to ground schools for training purposes.

Variants
CW-25
Prototype with fabric covered fuselage and tail surfaces
AT-9
Production aircraft with stressed-skin covering and two Lycoming R-680-9 radial engines, 491 built.
AT-9A
AT-9 with Lycoming R-680-11 radial engines and revised hydraulic system, 300 built before production ended in February 1943.

Operators

 United States Army Air Forces
 United States Air Force

Surviving aircraft

 41-12150 – AT-9 on static display at the National Museum of the United States Air Force in Dayton, Ohio. It required extensive restoration, and was the product of the museum staff incorporating two incomplete airframes together, along with parts fabricated on site.
 42-56882 – AT-9 in storage at the Pima Air & Space Museum in Tucson, Arizona. It was recovered from a crash site in 1993 and turned over to the museum for restoration. However, the aircraft is incomplete and will require a long and extensive restoration for display.

Specifications (AT-9)

See also

References

Notes

Bibliography

 Bowers, Peter M. Curtiss Aircraft, 1907–1947. London: Putnam & Company Ltd., 1979. .
 Mondey, David. American Aircraft of World War II (Hamlyn Concise Guide). London: Bounty Books, 2006. .

External links

 National Museum of the United States Air Force Fact Sheet

Curtiss AT-09
AT-9
World War II trainer aircraft of the United States
Low-wing aircraft
Aircraft first flown in 1941
Twin piston-engined tractor aircraft